Thailand competed in the 2010 Asian Beach Games, held in Muscat, Oman from 8–16 December 2010. The National Olympic Committee of Thailand sent 125 athletes (80 men and 45 women) which are competing in 11 sports. Thailand topped the rankings for the first time with 15 gold medals.

Competitors

Medal summary

Medals table

Medalists

External links 
Official Site
Thailand Medals Page

References 

Nations at the 2010 Asian Beach Games
2010
Asian Beach Games